Cornelius Nicholls (17 March 1838 – 1895) was an English first-class cricketer and umpire.

Nicholls, who was born at Pendleton in March 1838, made a single appearance in first-class cricket for the North against Surrey at The Oval in 1863. Batting at number eleven in the North's first-innings, he was unbeaten on 4, while in their second-innings he opened the batting and was dismissed for 14 runs by Tom Sewell. With the ball, he took figures of 4 for 19 in Surrey's first-innings and followed that up by taking figures of 4 for 44 in their second-innings. In the return fixture at Salford, Nicholls stood in the match as an umpire. Nicholls died on Chorlton in 1895.

References

External links

1838 births
1895 deaths
People from Pendleton, Greater Manchester
English cricketers
North v South cricketers
English cricket umpires